WPUT (90.1 FM) is a non-commercial educational radio station licensed to serve North Salem, New York, United States. The station is owned by Dennis and Maureen Jackson, through licensee Foothills Public Radio, Inc. The station airs a jazz music and community radio format.

History
This station received its original construction permit from the Federal Communications Commission on January 22, 2008.  The new station was assigned the call sign WVWA by the FCC on May 29, 2008.  While still under construction, the station applied for a new call sign and was assigned WJJZ by the FCC on September 22, 2008. The station was assigned the WJZZ call letters by the FCC on March 31, 2009. The station changed its call sign to WQCD on October 2, 2014, and to WPUT-FM on June 2, 2015; on July 8, 2015, the "-FM" suffix was dropped.

References

External links

PUT
Jazz radio stations in the United States
Radio stations established in 2012
2012 establishments in New York (state)
Jazz in New York (state)
Community radio stations in the United States